Memorial Santos–SaddleDrunk is a professional cycling team which competes in elite road bicycle racing events such as the UCI Women's World Tour. The team was established in 2016, registering with the UCI for the 2019 season.

Team roster

National Champions
2017
 Brazil Time Trial, Ana Paula Polegatch

2019
 Brazil Track (Individual pursuit), Taise Benato
 Argentina Track (Madison), Estefania Pilz

2021
 Brazil Time Trial, Ana Paula Polegatch
 Brazil Road race, Ana Paula Polegatch
 Finland Cyclo-cross, Minna-Maria Kangas

References

External links

UCI Women's Teams
Cycling teams established in 2016
Cycling teams based in Brazil